The 2014 Scotland Sevens was the eighth tournament within the 2013-2014 Sevens World Series. It was held over the weekend of 3–4 May 2014 at Scotstoun Stadium in Glasgow.

Format
The teams were drawn into four pools of four teams each. Each team played everyone in their pool once. The top two teams from each pool advanced to the Cup/Plate brackets. The bottom two teams went into the Bowl/Shield brackets.

Teams
The pools and schedule were announced on 7 April 2014.

Pool Stage

Pool A

Pool B

Pool C

Pool D

Knockout stage

Shield

Bowl

Plate

Cup

References

External links

Scotland Sevens
Scotland Sevens
Scotland Sevens
Scotland Sevens